The 2016 European Figure Skating Championships were held 25–31 January 2016 in Bratislava, Slovakia. Medals were awarded in the disciplines of men's singles, ladies' singles, pairs, and ice dancing.

Eligibility 
Skaters were eligible for the event if they represented a European member nation of the International Skating Union and had reached the age of 15 before July 1, 2015 in their place of birth. The corresponding competition for non-European skaters is the 2016 Four Continents Championships. National associations selected their entries according to their own criteria but the ISU mandated that their selections achieve a minimum technical elements score (TES) at an international event prior to the European Championships.

Minimum TES

Number of entries per discipline 
Based on the results of the 2015 European Championships, the ISU allowed each country one to three entries per discipline.

Entries 
National associations began announcing their selections in mid-December 2015. The ISU published a complete list on 5 January 2016:

Changes:
 Aimee Buchanan replaced Katarina Kulgeyko as Israel's entry in ladies.
 Chafik Besseghier withdrew due to a torn ligament in his right ankle. He was not replaced because France had named no substitutes.
 Yuko Kavaguti / Alexander Smirnov withdrew due to an Achilles tendon injury to Kavaguti. They were replaced by Evgenia Tarasova / Vladimir Morozov.
 Amani Fancy / Christopher Boyadji withdrew from the pairs' event and were not replaced because the Great Britain had no substitute in pairs.
 On 25 January, Ksenia Stolbova / Fedor Klimov withdrew due to Klimov's shoulder injury and were replaced by Kristina Astakhova / Alexei Rogonov.

Time schedule 
Wednesday, January 27
 Ladies - Short program: 10:15 - 15:25
 Opening ceremony: 16:45 - 17:05
 Men - Short program: 17:30 - 22:40
Thursday, January 28
 Ice dance - Short dance: 12:25 - 16:55
 Men - Free program: 17:45 - 21:50
Friday, January 29
 Pairs - Short program: 13:45 - 16:50
 Ladies - Free program: 18:00 - 21:55
Saturday, January 30
 Pairs - Free program: 10:00 - 13:00
 Ice dance - Free dance: 14:30 - 17:50
Sunday, January 31
 Gala exhibition: 14:30 - 17:00

Overview 
Bratislava hosted the European Figure Skating Championships for the fourth time, having previously hosted in 1958, 1966, and 2001.

In the men's event, Spain's Javier Fernández won his fourth consecutive European title, while silver medalist Oleksii Bychenko won the first-ever European medal for Israel.

In the ladies' event, Russia's Evgenia Medvedeva became the European champion in her first season on the senior international level. Teammates Elena Radionova and Anna Pogorilaya won their second consecutive silver and bronze medals, respectively.

In the pairs' event, Russia's Tatiana Volosozhar / Maxim Trankov won their fourth European title. Germany's Aliona Savchenko / Bruno Massot took silver in their first appearance at Europeans as a pair, while Evgenia Tarasova / Vladimir Morozov repeated as the bronze medalists.

In the ice dancing event, Gabriella Papadakis / Guillaume Cizeron of France won their second consecutive European title. Both Anna Cappellini / Luca Lanotte of Italy and Ekaterina Bobrova / Dmitri Soloviev of Russia stepped onto their fourth European podium.

Results

Men

Ladies

Pairs

Ice dancing

Medals summary

Medals by country 
Table of medals for overall placement:

Table of small medals for placement in the short segment:

Table of small medals for placement in the free segment:

Medalists 
Medals for overall placement

Small medals for placement in the short segment

Small medals for placement in the free segment

References

External links
 
 
  at the International Skating Union

2016
2016 in figure skating
2016 in Slovak sport
Sports competitions in Bratislava
2016 European Figure Skating Championships
International figure skating competitions hosted by Slovakia
January 2016 sports events in Europe